Statism and Anarchy (Gosudarstvennost' i anarkhiia, literally "Statehood and Anarchy") was the last work by the Russian anarchist Mikhail Bakunin. Written in the summer of 1873, the key themes of the work are the likely impact on Europe of the Franco-Prussian war and the rise of the German Empire, Bakunin's view of the weaknesses of the Marxist position and an affirmation of anarchism. Statism and Anarchy was the only one of Bakunin's major anarchist works to be written in Russian and was primarily aimed at a Russian audience, with an initial print run of 1,200 copies printed in Switzerland and smuggled into Russia.

Marshall Shatz writes that Statism and Anarchy "helped to lay the foundations of a Russian anarchist movement as a separate current within the revolutionary stream".

The quote The People's Stick, condemning tyranny imposed with the rationale that the state represents "the people" as in Marxism, originates in this book:

At one point, most of the socialist movement had been effectively anarchist, following the lead of individualist anarchist Pierre Joseph Proudhon. With the First Internationale it had effectively split into two factions, the anarcho-syndicalists typified by Bakunin, and the Marxists, who claimed an anarchist long-term goal of the state "withering away", but would impose an authoritarian "dictatorship of the proletariat" for the foreseeable future. In this quote, as in the book, Bakunin argued that the Marxist authoritarianism was little better than any other. His overall description of the ostensibly inevitable outcome of Marxism was very similar to Stalinism sixty years later.

Published editions

See also 
 List of books about anarchism

References 

1873 books
Anarchism in Russia
Mikhail Bakunin
Books about anarchism
Collectivist anarchism
Philosophy books
Statism